John K. Gowdy House, also known as the Rush County Historical Society, is a historic home located at Rushville, Rush County, Indiana.  It was built in 1888, and is a two-story, Queen Anne style brick dwelling.  It sits on a limestone foundation and has a complex hipped roof with asymmetrically placed gables.  It features a wraparound porch and second story porch.  Also on the property are the contributing carriage house (1905-1908), summer kitchen (1905-1908), pump, well, and rolled and cast-iron fence.  It has housed the Rush County Historical Society since 1940.

It was listed on the National Register of Historic Places in 1993.

References

External links
Rush County Historical Society website

History museums in Indiana
Houses on the National Register of Historic Places in Indiana
Queen Anne architecture in Indiana
Houses completed in 1888
Buildings and structures in Rush County, Indiana
National Register of Historic Places in Rush County, Indiana